German submarine U-2344 was a Type XXIII U-boat of Nazi Germany's Kriegsmarine during World War II.

Construction

U-2344 was ordered on 20 September 1943, and was laid down on 4 September 1944 at Deutsche Werft, Hamburg, as yard number 498. She was launched on 24 October 1944 and commissioned under the command of Oberleutnant zur See Hermann Ellerlage on 10 November of that year.

Design
Like all Type XXIII U-boats, U-2344 had a displacement of  when at the surface and  while submerged. The submarine was powered by one MWM six-cylinder RS134S diesel engine providing , one AEG GU4463-8 double-acting electric motor electric motor providing , and one BBC silent running CCR188 electric motor providing .

U-2344 was fitted with two  torpedo tubes in the bow. She could carry two preloaded torpedoes. The complement was 14–18 men. This class of U-boat did not carry a deck gun.

History
Like many other late war U-boats she arrived too late to turn the tide in favor of the Axis powers, despite her advanced design. U-2344 never undertook an operational patrol, and was lost on 18 February 1945 after a collision with one of her sister ships, . She sank quickly in position , taking 11 of the 14 crew members aboard to the bottom with her. The wreck was subsequently raised for study in 1956, although she was not restored. Ultimately, the hull was broken up at Rostock in 1958.

See also
 Battle of the Atlantic

References

Bibliography

External links

U-boats commissioned in 1944
World War II submarines of Germany
1944 ships
Type XXIII submarines
Ships built in Hamburg
U-boats sunk in collisions
U-boats sunk by German warships
World War II shipwrecks in the Baltic Sea
Maritime incidents in February 1945